CITIC Securities Co., Ltd. is a Chinese full-service investment bank.  It offers services in underwriting, research, brokerage, asset management, wealth management, and investment advisory. CITIC Securities was established in 1995 and it is headquartered in Shenzhen, Guangdong Province.

Listing
On January 6, 2003, CITIC Securities was listed on the Shanghai Stock Exchange (SSE).  On October 6, 2011, CITIC Securities was listed on the Hong Kong Stock Exchange (HKEX).

Awards
In 2011, CITIC Securities was awarded the "Best Equity House in China" and "Best Broker in China" by FinanceAsia; "China Equity House" by the IFR Asia; "Most Innovative Investment Bank from Asia" by The Banker. The research team have been awarded “Best Local Research Team” by New Fortune in six consecutive years.

Acquisitions
In July 2012, CITIC Securities agreed to acquire Crédit Agricole's Asia brokerage and research unit CLSA for $1.25 billion which 19.9 percent stake or $310.3 million will be bought in the first step and the remaining 80.1 percent stake or $941.7 million will be bought later.

In August 2015, CITIC Securities was reported to be in advanced talks with London Stock Exchange Group Plc to buy Russell Investments, an asset management firm based in the US. However the discussions was suspended due to a series of investigations into top CITIC Securities executives by Chinese authorities. In October London Stock Exchange announced the sale of Russell Investments to TA Associates, a Boston private equity firm for US$1.15 billion, much lower than US$1.8 billion offered by CITIC Securities.

Legal investigation
On August 25, 2015 the Chinese news media announced that several executives within CITIC Securities were under investigation for possible wrongdoing.

In September 15, the CEO of CITIC Securities was suspected by Chinese police of leaking and trading on unspecified inside information.

In December 2015, the head of CITIC Securities investment banking division and the head of overseas investment banking business were reported to be detained by authorities to assist investigation on potential insider trading and information leakage.

CITIC CEFC bond default 

In November 2016, CITIC CLSA acted as the sole bookrunner for CEFC Shanghai's $250 USD bond issuance. CITIC CLSA hid from the market that the bond deal was only 60% subscribed at pricing.  It manipulated the bond price in the secondary market in an effort to offload the 100mm USD bond CITIC CLSA held on its balance sheet. 

In May 2018, CITIC Group announced they would repay ca 450 million euros owed by CEFC Europe to finance and banking group J&T within days but since the debt was not paid a week later, J&T announced it had taken over shareholder rights and installed crisis management at CEFC Europe.   Several days later, CEFC Shanghai defaulted on $327 million in bond payments, and offered to make the payments six months after the maturity date. 

In October 2020, some retail CEFC bondholders in Hong Kong filed a complaint to the Securities and Futures Commission in Hong Kong against the bond's sole underwriter CITIC CLSA.

See also 
 Securities industry in China

References

External links
 CITIC Securities
 CITIC Securities Investor Relations

Financial services companies established in 1995
Banks established in 1995
Companies listed on the Shanghai Stock Exchange
Companies in the CSI 100 Index
Companies listed on the Hong Kong Stock Exchange
Investment banks in China
Companies based in Shenzhen
Government-owned companies of China
Financial services companies of China
CITIC Group
H shares